Baldwin Avenue railway station, in the suburb of Mount Albert, is on the Western Line of the Auckland railway network. The station has offset side platforms connected by a level crossing.

History 
 1907: Between 1907 and 1 June 1915, trains would halt at Avondale Road (modern-day Asquith Ave), close to the modern-day railway station.
 1953: Opened as a wayside halt on 28 September.
 1966: The line between Morningside and Avondale was double-tracked, leading to two new platforms being built. These platforms were off-set from each other.
 1993: The platforms were raised to meet the standards of the new ex-Perth trains.
 2011: An upgraded and lengthened station was opened, with the platforms directly opposite each other.

See also 
 List of Auckland railway stations

References 

Rail transport in Auckland
Railway stations in New Zealand
Railway stations opened in 1953
1953 establishments in New Zealand
Buildings and structures in Auckland